Dendropsophus cachimbo is a species of frog in the family Hylidae.
It is endemic to Brazil.
Its natural habitats are moist savanna, subtropical or tropical moist shrubland, freshwater marshes, and intermittent freshwater marshes.
It is threatened by habitat loss.

References

Sources

cachimbo
Endemic fauna of Brazil
Amphibians described in 1999
Taxonomy articles created by Polbot